Sarinda is a genus of ant mimicking jumping spiders that was first described by George and Elizabeth Peckham in 1892.

Species
 it contains seventeen species, found in the Americas from Argentina to the southern United States and on the Greater Antilles:
Sarinda armata (Peckham & Peckham, 1892) – Panama to Peru
Sarinda atrata (Taczanowski, 1871) – French Guiana
Sarinda capibarae Galiano, 1967 – Brazil
Sarinda cayennensis (Taczanowski, 1871) – Brazil, French Guiana
Sarinda chacoensis Galiano, 1996 – Argentina
Sarinda cutleri (Richman, 1965) – USA, Mexico
Sarinda exilis (Mello-Leitão, 1943) – Brazil
Sarinda glabra Franganillo, 1930 – Cuba
Sarinda hentzi (Banks, 1913) – USA
Sarinda imitans Galiano, 1965 – Argentina
Sarinda longula (Taczanowski, 1871) – French Guiana
Sarinda marcosi Piza, 1937 – Brazil, Argentina
Sarinda nigra Peckham & Peckham, 1892 (type) – Nicaragua, Brazil, Guyana, Argentina
Sarinda panamae Galiano, 1965 – Panama
Sarinda pretiosa Banks, 1909 – Costa Rica
Sarinda ruficeps (Simon, 1901) – Colombia
Sarinda silvatica Chickering, 1946 – Panama

References

External links
 Photographs of Sarinda species
 Painting of S. hentzi
 Picture of S. hentzi
 Picture of a Sarinda sp.
 Pictures of male and female S. cutleri

Salticidae genera
Salticidae
Spiders of North America
Spiders of South America